Agrostis delislei is a species of flowering plant in the family Poaceae, endemic to the subantarctic Amsterdam Island. It was first described by William Hemsley in 1884.

References

delislei
Flora of the Amsterdam and Saint Paul islands
Plants described in 1884